Royal  is a village near Talaja in Bhavnagar district in the Indian state of Gujarat.  the 2011 Census of India, it had a population of 2,955 across 540 households.

References 

Villages in Bhavnagar district